Team West-Tec F3 is a motor racing team owned by Gavin Wills and John Miller based in Corby in the United Kingdom, the most successful team in the history of the European F3 Open Championship, it also won two drivers championships in the ASCAR Racing Series.

History
From 2001 to 2006 the team took part in the ASCAR Racing Series which was mainly based locally at the Rockingham Motor Speedway. The team took two consecutive drivers titles in 2005 and 2006 with Michael Vergers and Oli Playle.

In 2007 Team West-Tec F3 became the first British team to compete in the Spanish Formula Three Championship, purchasing assets from leading GP2 team Racing Engineering. In 2009 the series was renamed the European F3 Open. Since 2007 the team has taken 44 wins and 116 podiums and three championship titles – including winning the support race at the 2008 European Grand Prix at Valencia.

In 2009 the team also returned to British Formula 3 International Series completing a full campaign with Max Snegirev as well as part campaigns for Mathieu Maurage, Miky Faccin, Jay Bridger and Ma Qinghua.

In 2010 the team continued in the European F3 Open but primarily used their British F3 cars for testing with drivers from F1, GP2 and GP3 – where young drivers get very little track time to develop and hone their skills. However the team continued to make occasional British F3 race starts and took a national class win with young Mexican, Juan Carlos Sistos on his series debut at Silverstone.

The team also announced a plan to form a new joint venture with China's motorsport team, Champ Racing, to enter an additional car under the banner of "Champ Motorsport with Team West-Tec". This venture started in September 2010 with experienced driver Michael Ho racing at Brands Hatch, Monza, Jerez and Barcelona. In his second race weekend, at Monza, Ho took third place in the Copa class,  fifth overall.

The team was successful in the European F3 Open in 2010, challenging at the front in both classes and winning races with more than one driver, eventually finishing as runner-up in both the driver's and teams' championships.

For 2011 the European F3 Open team featured four full-season drivers in Victor Corrêa, Fabio Gamberini, Luca Orlandi and Sam Dejonghe, plus a number of other drivers racing on part programmes during the year such as Fahmi Ilyas, Kotaro Sakurai and Tatiana Calderón.

The 2011 season was also successful. Victor Corrêa won two races and Fahmi Ilyas one in the team's newest Dallara F308s, Ilyas having made a debut at Brands Hatch in the car  later used by Tatiana Calderón who scored points at Barcelona after she stepped up from Star Mazda in the USA. Fabio Gamberini also won a race outright at Spa and also won an impressive ten times in the Copa class, where he was champion as well as being  third overall. Sam Dejonghe twice featured on the overall podium and took four Copa class wins to finish as Copa runner-up and Luca Orlandi, despite missing two races, secured third in Copa for an unprecedented 1-2-3 for the team. Kotaro Sakurai featured on the Brands Hatch Copa podium in Luca's place on his debut in the series. The team won the overall 2011 Teams' Championship.

For 2012, Sam Dejonghe returned with a single win before being dropped at the end of the year, to be replaced by Ed Jones. Manu Bejarano started the season but stopped with no budget after two rounds, although Roberto La Rocca, from Venezuela, joined the team. Jordan Oon and Luca Orlandi drove the team's Copa F308 entries, with Orlandi replaced by Kiwi Chris Vlok after an injury at Brands Hatch. After a much improved end to 2012, with Dejonghe and new signing Ed Jones taking second place at each of the last three meetings, Team West-Tec F3 remained the most successful team in the history of the series.

Team West-Tec had eight drivers in 2013, with Ed Jones winning the championship and Nelson Mason and  finishing third. Two further F312 cars were campaigned by Orlandi and La Rocca. The team also operated four Copa F308 cars for Sean (son of Tom) Walkinshaw, South African Liam Venter, Chinaman Huan Zhu and young British driver Cameron Twynham.

Team West-Tec F3 also returned with a three-car team to the reorganised British F3 series in 2013. Ed Jones took five wins from the twelve races in the second tier National Class.

In 2014, Yarin Stern, Tanart Sathienthirakul and Wei Fung Thong raced full-time for West-Tec in the renamed Euroformula Open. Nici Pohler did all rounds bar the final at Barcelona due to illness and was replaced by Fabian Schiller. Stern managed to grab the team 5 podiums over the year.

2014 also saw the beginning of West Tec's attack on the incredibly competitive FIA European F3 Championship with Felix Serralles taking on the whole season while Hector Hurst and Macau's Andy Chang split the season between each other.

Former series results

British Formula 3

† Shared results with Bridger Motorsport

Spanish Formula 3/European F3 Open/Euroformula Open

FIA Formula 3 European Championship

References

External links

 

West Tec
West Tec
FIA Formula 3 European Championship teams
Euroformula Open Championship teams
Auto racing teams established in 1988